Young's Market Company Building built in 1924 is a historic building located at  1610 West 7th Street, corner South Union Avenue, in the  Westlake neighborhood of Los Angeles, California.

It was originally a retail market and office building, designed by architect Charles F. Plummer.  The Spanish Renaissance Revival style building features marble columns and a terra-cotta frieze. In 1958, Young's moved to a headquarters building on Central Avenue.

It has been renovated into 44 live-work lofts in 1997. The original architect was Charles F. Plummer.

The Young's Market Company Building commercial block is a Los Angeles Historic-Cultural Monument. On June 15, 2004, it was added to the National Register of Historic Places.

See also
 List of Los Angeles Historic-Cultural Monuments in the Wilshire and Westlake areas
 List of Registered Historic Places in Los Angeles

References

Office buildings in Los Angeles
Westlake, Los Angeles
Office buildings completed in 1924
Commercial buildings on the National Register of Historic Places in Los Angeles
Los Angeles Historic-Cultural Monuments
Residential buildings in Los Angeles
Warehouses on the National Register of Historic Places
Spanish Revival architecture in California